Preston Judd (born May 28, 1999) is an American soccer player who plays as a forward for LA Galaxy in Major League Soccer.

Career

Youth
Judd was part of the Las Vegas Sports Academy.

College & Amateur
In 2017, Judd went to play college soccer at California Baptist University. In two years with the Lancers, Judd made 39 appearances, scoring 22 goals and tallying 4 assists. In his Freshman season he took Academic All-PacWest honors, and in his Sophomore season was named first-team All-WAC and second-team All-Far West Region, as well as to the WAC All-Academic team.

In 2019, Judd transferred to the University of Denver where he played a single season, scoring 7 goals and tallying 1 assist for the Pioneers. Judd was a 2019 Summit League All-Newcomer Team and was the 2019 Summit League Tournament MVP.

Professional
On January 13, 2021, Judd signed with USL Championship side Sporting Kansas City II. Judd had attended Kansas City's 2020 College Invitational Combine, for players who had missed the 2020 season due to the COVID-19 pandemic.

On January 21, 2021, Judd was selected 35th overall in the 2021 MLS SuperDraft by LA Galaxy. 

On April 7, 2021, it was announced Judd had signed with LA Galaxy II. On April 16, 2021, Sporting Kansas City confirmed they had agreed to terminate Judd's contract with the club to allow him to sign with the side who drafted him.

Judd made his professional debut on April 30, 2021, starting in a 1–0 loss to Sacramento Republic. Judd scored his first professional goal on May 5, 2021,   netting a 90th-minute goal to complete a 5–0 win over Las Vegas Lights. On June 16, 2021, Judd netted his first career hat-trick, scoring all three LA Galaxy II goals in a 4–3 loss to Las Vegas Lights.

On April 4, 2022, Judd moved to the LA Galaxy MLS roster, but still plays for Galaxy II

References

External links
 
 

1999 births
Living people
Association football forwards
American soccer players
California Baptist Lancers men's soccer players
Denver Pioneers men's soccer players
LA Galaxy draft picks
Sporting Kansas City II players
LA Galaxy II players
LA Galaxy players
Soccer players from Las Vegas
USL Championship players